Marvin Allen "Mal" Stevens (April 14, 1900 – December 6, 1979) was an American football player, coach, naval officer, and  orthopedic surgeon. He served as the head football coach at Yale University from 1928 to 1932 and at New York University from 1934 to 1941, compiling a career college football record of 54–45–10. He was elected to the College Football Hall of Fame as a player in 1974.

Early life, playing career, and education
Born in Stockton, Kansas, Stevens attended Washburn College for three years before transferring to Yale College. He lettered in three sports at Washburn and played halfback on Yale's undefeated 1923 football team.  He graduated from Yale in 1925 and was a member of Skull and Bones. He graduated from Yale Medical School in 1929.

Coaching career and military service
Stevens coached the Yale football team from 1928 to 1932, leaving to become the 21st head football coach at New York University in 1934. His coached at NYU through the 1941 season, compiling a record of 33 wins, 34 losses, and 2 ties.  This ranks him second at NYU in total wins and tenth at NYU in winning percentage. Stevens was awarded a place in the NYU Athletic Hall of Fame for his coaching efforts.

Stevens then served as a lieutenant commander in the United States Navy during World War II.  In 1946 he became head coach of the Brooklyn Dodgers of the All-America Football Conference.  He was the Eastern Director of the Sister Kenny Rehabilitation Institute and Clinic in Jersey City, New Jersey and clinical professor of orthopedic surgery at Bellevue Hospital Center.

Head coaching record

College

References

External links
 
 

1900 births
1979 deaths
20th-century American physicians
20th-century surgeons
American football halfbacks
American football quarterbacks
American men's basketball players
American orthopedic surgeons
Brooklyn Dodgers (AAFC) coaches
NYU Violets football coaches
Washburn Ichabods baseball players
Washburn Ichabods men's basketball players
Washburn Ichabods football players
Yale Bulldogs football players
Yale Bulldogs football coaches
Yale College alumni
Yale School of Medicine alumni
College men's tennis players in the United States
College men's track and field athletes in the United States
College Football Hall of Fame inductees
United States Navy personnel of World War II
United States Navy officers
People from Osborne County, Kansas
People from Stockton, Kansas
Coaches of American football from Kansas
Players of American football from Kansas
Basketball players from Kansas